Captain Fear, a Caribbean pirate captain, is the official mascot of the Tampa Bay Buccaneers of the National Football League. He has blue eyes, black hair, thick eyebrows, and a full beard. He has been the mascot of the Buccaneers since June 2000. He replaced a parrot mascot known as Skully. He was originally played by Mike Mashke until his retirement in 2006.

References

External links

Mascots introduced in 2000
National Football League mascots
Fictional sea captains
Fictional pirates